Colturano is a comune (municipality) in the Metropolitan City of Milan in the Italian region Lombardy, located about  southeast of Milan.

Colturano borders the following municipalities: Mediglia, Tribiano, San Giuliano Milanese, Dresano, Vizzolo Predabissi, Melegnano.

References

External links
 Official website

Cities and towns in Lombardy